It's True may refer to:

"It's True", a song by Backstreet Boys in their album For the Fans
"It's True", a song by BJ the Chicago Kid from his album The M.A.F.E. Project
"It's True", a song by Salem Al Fakir from his album This Is Who I Am
"It's True", a relaunch of the earlier song credited to Axwell & Sebastian Ingrosso vs. Salem Al Fakir

See also
It's True! It's True!, 1969 album by Bill Cosby